Ian Kirby (born 1945) is president of the Botswana Court of Appeal and a former Attorney General of Botswana.

References

Living people
1945 births
Botswana judges
People named in the Panama Papers